Ketino Kachiani or Ketino Kachiani-Gersinska (born 11 September 1971 in Mestia, Georgia) is a Georgian chess player with the titles of Woman Grandmaster (1990) and International Master (1997). She is ranked 6th female German player.

She won the World Junior Chess Championship (girls) in 1989 and 1990, and the Georgian Chess Championship (women) in 1987.

She later moved to Germany, married a German called Gersinska, and acquired German citizenship.

References

External links 

1971 births
Living people
Chess International Masters
Female chess players from Georgia (country)
Chess woman grandmasters